Teknaf ( Ṭeknaf) is an upazila of Cox's Bazar District in the Division of Chittagong, Bangladesh. It forms the southernmost point in mainland Bangladesh (St. Martin's Island is the southernmost point). The name of the region comes from the Naf River which forms the Eastern boundary of the upazila. It shares a border with Myanmar, oppsite the town of Maungdaw.

Geography
It has 23,675 households and a total area of 388.68 km2.
The tidal range at the Teknaf coastal area is strongly influenced by the Naaf river estuary. The area has a warm tropical climate and sufficient rainfall to enable it to support a wide biological diversity.

Teknaf Peninsula is one of the longest sandy beach ecosystems (80 km) in the world. It represents a transitional ground for the fauna of the Indo-Himalayan and Indo-Malayan ecological sub-regions. Important habitats at the site include mangrove, mudflats, beaches and sand dunes, canals and lagoons and marine habitat. Mangrove forest occurs in Teknaf peninsula both as natural forest with planted stands and mostly distributed in the inter-tidal zone. The Teknaf peninsula mangroves support the habitat of 161 different species of fish. Teknaf reserved forest is one of the oldest reserved forests in Bangladesh.

Climate
Teknaf has a tropical monsoon climate (Am) with warm, dry winters and warm, extremely rainy summers.

Demographics
According to the 1991 Bangladesh census, Teknaf had a population of 152,557. Males constituted 51.81% of the population, and females 48.19%. The population aged 18 or over was 64,417. Teknaf had an average literacy rate of 16.6% (7+ years), against the national average of 32.4%.

Administration
Teknaf Upazila is divided into Teknaf Municipality and six union parishads: Baharchara, Hnila, Sabrang, Saint Martin, Teknaf, and Whykong. The union parishads are subdivided into 12 mauzas and 146 villages.

Teknaf Municipality is subdivided into 9 wards and 16 mahallas.

See also

List of Upazilas of Bangladesh

References

External links
 
 

 
Upazilas of Cox's Bazar District
Bangladesh–Myanmar border crossings